St. Matthew's Cathedral, also called Osorno Cathedral, is a Catholic cathedral located in the city of Osorno in the South American country of Chile.

St. Matthew's Cathedral is located in the vicinity of the Plaza de Armas of Osorno and is considered an architectural jewel of Gothic style, and a major tourist site in the city of Osorno. Its designer is the Chilean architect León Prieto Casanova.

It noted for its imposing tower 45 meters high and its large and colorful mosaics and stained-glass windows with representations of biblical figures.

The original cathedral was built in 1577. After the 1960 earthquake, which caused serious structural damage to the cathedral, there was total demolition.

The first stone of the new cathedral was blessed and laid on May 1, 1962, and 15 years later, on November 24, 1977, the new building was consecrated.

See also
Roman Catholicism in Chile
St. Matthew's Cathedral (disambiguation)

References

Roman Catholic cathedrals in Chile
Buildings and structures in Osorno, Chile
Roman Catholic churches completed in 1977
20th-century Roman Catholic church buildings in Chile
Rebuilt buildings and structures in Chile